"War of Nerves" is a song by English-Canadian girl group All Saints, released by London Records on 23 November 1998 as the fifth and final single from their debut album, All Saints. Group members Shaznay Lewis, Natalie Appleton and Nicole Appleton wrote the song with producers Cameron McVey and Magnus Fiennes. It is a ballad concerning mortality, inspired by the death of Diana, Princess of Wales. "War of Nerves" debuted at number seven on the UK Singles Chart, making it the group's fifth consecutive single to reach the top 10.

Background
"War of Nerves" was the last song recorded for the group's 1997 debut album, All Saints. The group wrote the song as a response to the death of Diana, Princess of Wales. In an interview for The Irish Times, group member Shaznay Lewis reflected, "I never really thought about things like my own death until it happened to Diana. And the song definitely did help me face those feelings." Natalie Appleton named it her favourite song on the album in the Appleton autobiography Together, saying, "the emotions are powerful and it gives me chills."

Critical reception
In his review of All Saints for Rolling Stone,  Chuck Eddy said the song "has an aptly unnerving prettiness". Sarah Davis of Dotmusic gave "War of Nerves" four out of five stars, writing, "A distinctly heart-felt ballad, it's more soulful than most of their previous releases, including 'Never Ever' and while at first appears to go nowhere, is an engaging listen." Conversely, Caitlin Moran of The Times believed "War of Nerves" proved that "Never Ever" was "a one-off, a glorious anomaly" and "the albatross around their necks". NMEs Jim Firth derided it as "unfettered toss" and "a sawn-off version of the Lionel Richie song book", concluding, "No tune, no soul, no fun." Len Righi of The Morning Call wrote that All Saints seem "determined to embody monotony" on the track. In retrospective reviews, Jon O'Brien from AllMusic said "the gorgeous, sweeping strings of soulful ballad 'War of Nerves' have aged better than most of their contemporaries' output", while The Guardians Caroline Sullivan found the song forgettable.

Track listing
These are the formats and track listings of major single releases of "War of Nerves".

Music video
The music video of "War of Nerves" is set in London's famous Met Bar in the Metropolitan Hotel. It also features a London bus with an advertisement for All Saints which was visible in London for quite a while. Member Melanie Blatt's pregnancy was also written in the concept for the video as she would be shown singing in the shower, exposing her belly in a silhouette. It also features a fight in a garage, between sisters Natalie and Nicole Appleton, they later comfort each other.

Live performances
The song has been performed in a number of All Saints' concerts since their 2014 comeback. In the album version, lead vocals are shared by Shaznay Lewis and Melanie Blatt, however Natalie Appleton has taken over Lewis's lead vocals for all recent live performances. In the 2016 Red Flag tour, the song was combined with Red Flag single "This Is A War".

Charts

Certifications

References

 

1997 songs
1998 singles
1990s ballads
All Saints (group) songs
London Records singles
Songs written by Shaznay Lewis
Songs written by Cameron McVey
Song recordings produced by Cameron McVey
Sentimental ballads